Methodist Girls' College is a provincial school in Trincomalee, Sri Lanka.

See also
 List of schools in Eastern Province, Sri Lanka

References

Former Methodist schools in Sri Lanka
Provincial schools in Sri Lanka
Schools in Trincomalee